Michel Ferlus (born 1935) is a French linguist whose special study is in the historical phonology of languages of Southeast Asia. In addition to phonological systems, he also studies writing systems, in particular the evolution of Indic scripts in Southeast Asia.

Biography 
Michel Ferlus was born in 1935. He followed classes in ethnology and prehistory taught by André Leroi-Gourhan; in 'primitive religions' by Roger Bastide; in linguistics by André Martinet; and in Southeast Asian languages and history by George Cœdès. He worked in Laos as a teacher from 1961 to 1968. This allowed him to do fieldwork on languages of Laos, including Hmong and Yao (Hmong-Mien family), Khmu/Khamou and Lamet (Austroasiatic/Mon-Khmer), as well as Phu Noi/Phou-Noy (Sino-Tibetan). He became a researcher at Centre National de la Recherche Scientifique in 1968. 
He mainly did fieldwork in Thailand and Burma (Myanmar) in the 1980s, studying Wa, Lawa, Palaung, Mon and Nyah Kur; in Vietnam and Laos in the 1990s, studying Viet-Muong (also known as Vietic) languages, and the Tai languages and writing systems of northern and central areas of Vietnam, including the Lai Pao writing system of Vietnam, which was close to falling into oblivion.

He has published extensively about his findings on numerous languages of Laos, Thailand, Burma/Myanmar, and Vietnam, in journals such as Mon-Khmer Studies, Cahiers de Linguistique Asie Orientale, and Diachronica.

Main findings
Michel Ferlus's main discoveries relate to the effects of monosyllabicization on the phonological structure of Southeast Asian languages. Tonogenesis (the development of lexical tones), registrogenesis (the development of lexically contrastive phonation-type registers), the evolution of vowel systems all partake in a general (panchronic) model of evolution. Phenomena such as the spirantization of medial obstruents, which resulted in a major historical change in the sound inventory of Vietnamese, are also part of the broad set of changes—originating in monosyllabicization—that swept through East/Southeast Asia.

Selected publications
 “La langue souei : mutations consonantiques et bipartition du système vocalique,” Bull. Société Linguist. Paris, vol. 66, no. 1, pp. 378–388, 1971.
 “Simplification des groupes consonantiques dans deux dialectes austroasiens du Sud-Laos,” Bull. Société Linguist. Paris, vol. 66, no. 1, pp. 389–403, 1971.
 
 “Essai de phonétique historique du khmer (du milieu du premier millénaire de notre ère à l’époque actuelle),” Mon-Khmer Stud., vol. 21, pp. 57–89, 1992.
 
 “Langues et peuples viet-muong,” Mon-Khmer Stud., vol. 26, pp. 7–28, 1996.
 
 “Le maleng brô et le vietnamien,” Mon-Khmer Stud., vol. 27, pp. 55–66, 1997.
 
 “Les systèmes de tons dans les langues viet-muong,” Diachronica, vol. 15, no. 1, pp. 1–27, 1998.
 “Les disharmonies tonales en viet-muong et leurs implications historiques,” Cah. Linguist. - Asie Orient., vol. 28, no. 1, pp. 83–99, 1999.
 “On borrowing from Middle Chinese into Proto-Tibetan: a new look at the problem of the relationship between Chinese and Tibetan,” in Language variation: papers on variation and change in the Sinosphere and the Indosphere in honour of James A. Matisoff, D. Bradley, R. LaPolla, B. Michailovsky, and G. Thurgood, Eds. Canberra: Pacific Linguistics, 2003, pp. 263–275.
 “The Origin of Tones in Viet-Muong,” in Papers from the Eleventh Annual Conference of the Southeast Asian Linguistics Society 2001, Somsonge Burusphat, Ed. Tempe, Arizona: Arizona State University Programme for Southeast Asian Studies Monograph Series Press, 2004, pp. 297–313.
 “What were the four divisions of Middle Chinese?,” Diachronica, vol. 26, no. 2, pp. 184–213, 2009.

References

External links
 Bibliography on the website of AEFEK
 Open-access publications by Michel Ferlus, from the SEALANG archive
 Open-access publications by Michel Ferlus, from the HAL archive
 Google Scholar profile
 "Michel Ferlus en quelques mots": biographical note (in French) on the website of AEFEK
 Audio recordings of languages of Southeast Asia, made available through the Pangloss Collection (open-access): Tai languages; Vietic subgroup of Austroasiatic: Arem, Cuối Chăm, Mường

Linguists of Southeast Asian languages
Linguists from France
Historical linguists
Living people
1935 births
Linguists of Austroasiatic languages
Linguists of Sino-Tibetan languages
French National Centre for Scientific Research scientists